Love Has Many Faces is a 1965 American drama romance film directed by Alexander Singer, and written by Marguerite Roberts. Nancy Wilson sings the title song and Edith Head designed Lana Turner's clothes.

Plot
When a dead American "beach boy" is washed up on a beach in Acapulco, the police do an investigation to see if it was murder. Lieutenant Riccardo Andrade (Enrique Lucero) of the Mexican police interviews three suspects. Hank Walker (Hugh O'Brian) is another beach boy who works as a gigolo and also blackmails vacationing middle-aged American women. Pete Jordan (Cliff Robertson) is a former beach boy who married rich American Kit (Lana Turner). Kit met Pete when he was selling his blood and bought all of him. The dead man was wearing a bracelet engraved "LOVE IS THIN ICE," which the police discover was given to him by Kit. They also discover that he'd had an affair with her.

In addition to the police, the dead American's deserted girlfriend, Carol Lambert (Stefanie Powers), comes to Mexico to find out about her former boyfriend's death.

Cast
 Lana Turner as  Katherine Lawson "Kit" Chandler Jordan 
 Cliff Robertson as  Pete Jordan 
 Hugh O'Brian as  Hank Walker 
 Ruth Roman as  Margot Eliot 
 Stefanie Powers as Carol Lambert  
 Virginia Grey as  Irene Talbot 
 Ron Husmann as  Chuck Austin 
 Enrique Lucero as  Lieutenant Riccardo Andrade 
 Carlos Montalbán as  Don Julian 
 Jaime Bravo as  Manuel Perez 
 Fanny Schiller as  Maria 
 René Dupeyrón as Ramos

Beach Boy Quotes
 Nothing illegal, just immoral
 Always treat a tramp like a lady and a lady like a tramp.
 Is there anything you wouldn't do for money? If there is I haven't found it yet. 
 Money may wrinkle, but it never gets old.

See also
List of American films of 1965

References

External links
 
 
 
 

1965 films
Films set in Mexico
Films shot in Mexico
Columbia Pictures films
1960s English-language films
1965 drama films
American drama films
Films scored by David Raksin
Films directed by Alexander Singer
1960s American films